Calinog, officially the Municipality of Calinog,  is a 1st class municipality in the province of Iloilo, Philippines. According to the 2020 census, it has a population of 62,853 people.

Etymology
The town got its name from the Kinaray-a word "kalinong" which means calm or placid. But some might say it is from "linog" or an earthquake given the fact that the town lies near the West Panay Fault.

History

Calinog, which according to legend Datu Marikudo chose to settle, is strategically located in the central part of the Island of Panay. Calinog was already a developing community when the Spaniards came between the 16th and the 17th Century. In the early 18th Century, Calinog was established as a permanent settlement following the system of town planning as prescribed by the Law of the Indies: a town plaza surrounded by the church, Municipal Tribunal, school and public market. This remains as the main town-planning feature of the poblacion until the present. The Spanish Colonial Government then declared Calinog as “Pueblo” or town in 1763.

A new colonial power, the Americans introduced important changes in the civil affairs of the municipality in the early 1900s. The most significant was annexing Calinog as part of the Municipality of Passi (now a component city of Iloilo) from 1904 to 1920. Through intense lobbying by prominent leaders, Calinog was restored to its original status as a separate Municipality in January 1921.

It was in the late 1960s when Calinog stepped on the springboard of development as a progressive Municipality bustling with business and economic opportunities. In 1969, with the sugar industry boom, the political leadership decided to split a portion of the town into a separate municipality, the Municipality of Bingawan.

Among the founders of the old communities in the uplands were the descendants of the families who fought the abusive Spanish colonizers in the settlements of Bugasong and Lawaan, Province of Antique, in the 16th Century (their colorful folklore and the oral tradition of their historical journeys became a part of the timeless epic, “Hinilawod”). Mt. Dila Dila in Barangay Alibunan is best remembered as a strong hold of Filipino guerillas and soldiers during World War II under the command of a Calinognon Major Julian C. Chaves where the fiercest battles in the annals of war in the Island of Panay were fought against the Japanese Imperial Army.

Geography
The town of Calinog nestles in the central part of Panay Island. It is the last municipality in the central part of Iloilo Province which adjourns the province of Capiz. It is located at geographical coordinates 11°15′ latitude and 122°30′ longitudes. It has a total land area of 27,446 hectares representing about 5% of the total land area (532,297) of the entire Province.

Soil
Around 75% of the municipality's slope is above 8% or category C. The municipality, however, is mainly agricultural. There are four (4) types of soil in Calinog: 1) Umingan fine sandy loam; 2) Alimodian clay loam; 3) Bantog clay loam and 4) Alimodian soil (undifferentiated).

Topography
The municipality has mixed topographic reliefs. The westernmost portion is very mountainous. The central and northern areas have gently sloping reliefs while the eastern and southern portions are flat lands or plains with also gently sloping reliefs. All urban barangays are located in the lowland area.

The slope category of the municipality are: A (0-8%) 5,049 hectares; Category B (3-5%) 1,644 hectares; Category C (5-8%) 9,056 hectares; Category D (8-15%) 4,199 hectares and Category E (15-18%) 6,971 hectares.

Water sources
Jalaur River is the main source of water supply most specially for irrigation purposes considering the fact that this river is one of the biggest in terms of source volume in the whole Panay Island. For Potable Water, there is one pumping station at Barangay Bo. Calinog as its main source and one back-up pumping station at Barangay Simsiman along the Jalaur River.

Climate

Calinog falls under the third type consisting of seasons, which are not very pronounced relatively dry from November to April and wet during the rest of the year. The maximum rain periods are not very pronounced with a short dry season lasting only from one to three months. It is influenced by the southeast monsoons, which one of the principal air streams affecting the country. Its exposure to prevailing winds maybe affected by the local topography.

Calinog is relatively dry from November to April and wet during the rest of the year. The maximum rain periods are not very heavy with a short dry season lasting from one to three months. The climate is influenced by the southeast monsoons, one of the principal air streams affecting the country. Local topography affects its exposure to prevailing winds.

Barangays
Calinog is politically subdivided into 59 barangays. The Poblacion area is composed of four (4) barangays, namely: Poblacion Centro, Poblacion Ilaya, Poblacion Delgado and Poblacion Rizal Ilaud. There is a proposed additional five (5) barangays to be included in the urban land area. They are Barangays Carvasana, Dalid, Simsiman, Bo. Calinog, and Libot. They will constitute the greater Poblacion area.

Demographics

Ethnic groups
There are two ethnic groups identified. They are the Sulodnon or Bukidnon tribe and the Aeta. The Sulodnon or Bukidnon tribe comprises the thirteen (13) mountain barangays. The Aeta group resides in the different barangays of the municipality.

Languages
The main local languages are Hiligaynon, Capiznon and Kinaray-a. Filipino and English are also used and understood by the local residents, but are seldom used every day.

Tourism
Calinog is home to the Hirinugyaw-Suguidanonay Festival. From a Visayan term for "jubilation" or "rejoicing," "Hirinugyaw" was inspired by the Dinagyang Festival of Iloilo City and has become a feast with success for the people Calinog through a festivity showing the town's devotion to the Child Jesus and highlighted as it turns out in celebration for the feast of Santo Niño.
People make effort to perform colorful cultural dances and other festive commemorative rites in His honor. The festival has given life in their faith and has become a growing devotion in their hearts. The dances performed are usually thought to be simple dances composed of repetitive, easy-to-learn steps. However the presentation becomes highly complex with the incorporation of a Sugidanon---traditional stories on a town's history and culture narrated through chanting. It is used to highlight the dances in order to heighten the dramatic or comic effect of the presentation. As a whole, the festival functions to create or promote a sense of community as it continues to make the community feel part of a provincial or regional group to help them establish ties with their heritage.

Economy

References

External links
 [ Philippine Standard Geographic Code]
 Philippine Census Information
 Local Governance Performance Management System

Municipalities of Iloilo